Juhor (Serbian Cyrillic: Јухор) is a mountain in central Serbia, near the city of Paraćin. Its highest peak, Veliki Vetren, is at an elevation of 774 metres above sea level. Juhor borders the river Velika Morava to its east and the territory of Levač to its west.

Findings from the 3rd century BC in Veliki Vetren include a chest containing some 14 sets of weapons, harness gear, jewelry, and clothing accessories characteristic of knights of Dacian and Scordisci origin.

References

Mountains of Serbia
Archaeological sites in Serbia
Rhodope mountain range